The 1983 Vuelta a España was the 38th edition of the Vuelta a España, one of cycling's Grand Tours. The Vuelta began in Almussafes, with a prologue individual time trial on 19 April, and Stage 10 occurred on 29 April with a stage to Soria. The race finished in Madrid on 8 May.

Prologue
19 April 1983 — Almussafes to Almussafes,  (ITT)

Stage 1
20 April 1983 — Almussafes to Cuenca,

Stage 2
21 April 1983 — Cuenca to Teruel,

Stage 3
22 April 1983 — Teruel to Sant Carles de la Ràpita,

Stage 4
23 April 1983 — Sant Carles de la Ràpita to Sant Quirze del Vallès,

Stage 5
24 April 1983 — Sant Quirze del Vallès to Castellar de n'Hug,

Stage 6
25 April 1983 — La Pobla de Lillet to Viella,

Stage 7
26 April 1983 — Les to Sabiñánigo,

Stage 8

Stage 9
28 April 1983 — Panticosa to Alfajarín,

Stage 10
29 April 1983 — Zaragoza to Soria,

References

1983 Vuelta a España
Vuelta a España stages